The Chery A1 is a supermini car produced by the Chinese manufacturer Chery from 2007 to 2015.

Engines and equipment

Engines

Trim levels
There are three trim levels available Standard, Comfortable and Luxury. Both Comfortable and Luxury include air conditioning, alloy wheels, ABS, EBD, CD/MP3 player, electric windows, power steering, trip computer, rear reverse radar and central locking. The Luxury model includes front three-point seat belts with emergency locking retractor (ELR).

Marketing

Europe
In Italy, it was assembled by the DR Motor Company from semi-knocked down kits and marketed under its own brand, as the DR2. It was introduced at the 2009 Geneva Motor Show, as the third model marketed by the Italian company. It is available with 15-inch alloy rims and Euro V-compliant engine, and can be fitted with leather upholstery and an LPG kit.

In Europe, it is also marketed in Russia, Ukraine, Serbia, Macedonia and Turkey.

Australia

In Australia, sales commenced in 2011 (in all states except Victoria), under the name of J1 (as Audi sells the A1 model there). The initial release price was $11,990 AUD; however, a $1,000 cashback offer was made available. This made it one of the cheapest new cars available in Australia, along with the Proton S16, Suzuki Alto and Geely MK (sold in Western Australia only).

It was equipped with more features for the Australian market, including 14-inch alloy wheels, front fog lamps, two front airbags, a six-speaker CD player, air-conditioning, electric windows and side mirrors and a rear windscreen wiper along with a strengthened body and grill. Optional features were floor mats, reversing sensors, Bluetooth connectivity and headlight covers.

Safety features such as ABS and EBD were also included; however, electronic stability control was unavailable. Because of this, the vehicle was never sold in the state of Victoria, which requires all new vehicles sold after 1 January 2011 to come with ESC. This requirement became Australia-wide as from 1 November 2013, effectively banning the car along with some others. Also, it does not have side airbags. With these shortfalls, the Chery J1 scored a three star result in Australian ANCAP tests, making it one of the equal least-safe vehicles sold in the country. Indeed, ANCAP states that it "does not recommend purchasing vehicles with less than 4 stars". A defect in the seat frame necessitated a safety recall in August 2011.

References

External links

A1
Subcompact cars
2010s cars
Cars introduced in 2007
ANCAP superminis